Home ownership in Australia is considered a key cultural icon, and part of the Australian tradition known as the Great Australian Dream of "owning a detached house on a fenced block of land." Home ownership has been seen as creating a responsible citizenry; according to a former Premier of Victoria: "The home owner feels that he has a stake in the country, and that he has something worth working for, living for, fighting for."

In 2016 there were about 9.9 million private dwellings in Australia, each with, on average, 2.6 occupants. In 1966 about 70% of dwellings were owner-occupied – one of the largest proportions of any country. The remainder were rented dwellings. About half of the owner-occupied dwellings were under mortgage.

Owner-occupied housing in Australia is not treated as an investment asset. Mortgage interest is not tax deductible as, for example, in the United States. An owner-occupied residential home is not subject to the capital gains tax on sale and is not counted in the assets test for Centrelink pension purposes. It is also not taxed for land tax, although such taxes are traditionally determined at a state level.

In the past, home ownership has been described as equalising; in postwar Australia, immigrant Australians could often buy homes as quickly as native-born Australians. Additionally, Australian suburbs have been more socio-economically mixed than those in America and to a lesser extent Britain. In Melbourne, for instance, one early observer noted that "a poor house stands side by side with a good house."

There are significant regional differences in rates of homeownership around Australia, reflecting average age differences (e.g., older age people tend to own houses more than younger people), as well as socio-economic differences.

Statistics
In the 2015–16 Survey of Income and Housing, it was found that an estimated 30% of households owned their homes outright (i.e. without a mortgage) and 37% were owners with a mortgage. A further 25% were renting from a private landlord and 4% were renting from a state or territory housing authority.

Between June 1995 and June 2015, the proportion of households without a mortgage declined from 42% to 31%, while the proportion with a mortgage rose from 30% to 36%. Since 1999-2000 the proportion of households renting from state/territory housing authorities has declined from 6% to 3%  while the proportion renting privately increased from 20% to 26% in 2019-20. While a greater proportion of all renting households are renting from private landlords, there is an increased number of private renters receiving Commonwealth rent assistance.

Home ownership in Australia decreased to 67% in 2011, the lowest level in over 50 years. Tasmania has the highest home-ownership rate at 70%, and the Northern Territory the lowest at 46%.

As of the 2016 Census, home ownership in Australia had decreased to 65%.

Property as an investment
The 25% of dwellings which are rented by private landlords may be considered income-producing or investment properties, and the private landlords as investors, though some owner-occupiers may also view their dwellings as investments. Private landlords generally collect rent from a tenant as taxable income, whilst an owner-occupier derives imputed rent from living in the dwelling, and is also not subject to capital gains tax. Similarly, the investor can claim expenses relating to the property, including property taxes, interest and depreciation, whilst the owner-occupier cannot. The rent paid by a tenant for private or domestic purposes is not generally an allowable deduction of the tenant, nor are any expenses relating to the property.

Affordability 

Home ownership in Australia is becoming more exclusive. The ratio of the price of the average home to Australians' average income was at an all-time high in the late 1990s. Young people are buying homes at the lowest rates ever, and changes in work patterns are reducing many households' ability to retain their homes.

Characteristics
New homes have increased in size  and hold fewer people on average than in the past. The proportion of houses with four or more bedrooms increased from 15% in 1971 to greater than 30% in 2001.

Immigration to Australia
A number of economists, such as Macquarie Bank analyst Rory Robertson, assert that high immigration and the propensity of new arrivals to cluster in the capital cities is exacerbating the nation's housing affordability problem. According to Robertson, Federal Government policies that fuel demand for housing, such as the currently high levels of immigration, as well as capital gains tax discounts and subsidies to boost fertility, have had a greater impact on housing affordability than land release on urban fringes.

The Productivity Commission Inquiry Report No. 28 First Home Ownership (2004) also stated, in relation to housing, "that Growth in immigration since the mid-1990s has been an important contributor to underlying demand, particularly in Sydney and Melbourne." This has been exacerbated by Australian lenders relaxing credit guidelines for temporary residents, allowing them to buy a home with a 10 percent deposit.

The RBA in its submission to the same PC Report also stated "rapid growth in overseas visitors such as students may have boosted demand for rental housing". However, in question in the report was the statistical coverage of resident population. The "ABS population growth figures omit certain household formation groups – namely, overseas students and business migrants who do not continuously stay for 12 months in Australia." This statistical omission lead to the admission: "The Commission recognises that the ABS resident population estimates have limitations when used for assessing housing demand. Given the significant influx of foreigners coming to work or study in Australia in recent years, it seems highly likely that short-stay visitor movements may have added to the demand for housing. However, the Commissions are unaware of any research that quantifies the effects."

Some individuals and interest groups have also argued that immigration causes overburdened infrastructure.

Foreign investment in residential property
In December 2008, the federal government introduced legislation relaxing rules for foreign buyers of Australian property. According to FIRB (Foreign Investment Review Board) data released in August 2009, foreign investment in Australian real estate had increased by more than 30% year to date. One agent said that "overseas investors buy them to land bank, not to rent them out. The houses just sit vacant because they are after capital growth."

Inner-city apartment boom
To cope with the high demand of housing, the desirability in renting, and most significantly an influx of immigration, major Australian cities have seen a boom in high-rise apartment construction. According to ABC News and UBS, the number of cranes on Australian high-rise sites levelled out at a peak of 548, having surged 323% since late-2013.

See also

 Australian property market
 Poverty in Australia
 Public housing in Australia
 Housing in Victoria

References

External links
 Home Owners And Renters

Australian culture
Society of Australia
Housing in Australia
Ownership